Potassium phosphide is an inorganic semiconductor compound with the formula K3P. It appears as a white crystalline solid or powder. It reacts violently with water and is toxic via ingestion, inhalation and skin absorption. It has a hexagonal structure.

Synthesis 
Potassium phosphide can be synthesised by simply reacting the two elements together:

 12K + P4 -> 4K3P

Applications 
Potassium phosphide is used in high power, high frequency applications and also in laser diodes.

References 

Phosphides
Potassium compounds
Semiconductors